Mary Talbot may refer to:

 Mary Talbot, Countess of Northumberland, courtier who married Anne Boleyn's former suitor, Henry Percy
 Mary Talbot, Countess of Shrewsbury (1556–1632), daughter of Bess of Hardwick
 Mary Talbot Herbert, Countess of Pembroke, (c. 1594 – 1649), daughter of the above
 Mary Anne Talbot (1778–1808), English woman who posed as male during the French Revolutionary Wars
 Mary M. Talbot, scholar and author of Dotter of Her Father's Eyes
 Mary Armine, née Talbot, benefactress
 Mary Talbot (entomologist) (1903–1990), American entomologist
 Mary Talbot (WRNS officer) (1922–2012), British naval officer